Napoleon of India can refer to the following individuals:

Samudra Gupta (335–375)"Napoleon of North India"
Rajendra I (1014-1044) "Napoleon of South India"(and South East Asia)
Gangya Dev (1010-1041) "Napoleon of West India"
Hemu (1501-1556) "Napoleon of Medieval India"
Yashwantrao Holkar (1776-1811)
Maharaja Ranjeet Singh (1799-1839)
General Zorawar Singh (1786-1841) "Little Napoleon of India"
Chilarai (1510-1571)